This is a list of episodes from the American animated series Looney Tunes Cartoons. The show premiered on May 27, 2020 on HBO Max.

Series overview

Episodes

Season 1 (2020–21)

Season 2 (2021)

Season 3 (2021)

Season 4 (2022)

Season 5 (2022)

Shorts yet to be packaged

Notes

References 

Lists of American children's animated television series episodes
Looney Tunes